Our Lady of the Rosary Cathedral is a Roman Catholic cathedral located in San Bernardino, California, United States.  It is the seat of the Diocese of San Bernardino.

History

Our Lady of the Rosary Parish was founded in 1927 by Bishop John Cantwell of Los Angeles.  The first pastor assigned to the parish was the Rev. Patrick Curran.  A rented house on Sierra Way initially served as a combination church and rectory.  Construction of the present church building began in May 1928.  It was completed in the Mission Revival architectural style in September of the same year.  The present rectory was built in 1936.  In addition to their parish responsibilities the parish priests also served as the chaplains of St. Bernardine, County and the State hospital in Patton, as well as the Native American Reservation at Del Rosa and Masses at Lake Arrowhead in the summer.

Our Lady of the Rosary School was opened on January 6, 1947.  The Dominican Sisters from Houston, Texas served as the faculty.  The convent was built in 1950. The original school building was replaced with a new facility across the street from the old one.  The church building was enlarged and expanded in 1953.

On July 14, 1978 Pope Paul VI established the Diocese of San Bernardino.  Our Lady of the Rosary was named as the cathedral for the new diocese.

See also

List of Catholic cathedrals in the United States
List of cathedrals in the United States

References

External links

Official Cathedral Site
Roman Catholic Diocese of San Bernardino Official Site
 

SanBernardino Cathedral
SanBernardino Cathedral
Our Lady of the Rosary San Bernardino
Buildings and structures in San Bernardino, California
SanBernardino Cathedral
20th-century Roman Catholic church buildings in the United States
Tourist attractions in San Bernardino, California